The Inland Norway University of Applied Sciences (also known as INN University) is a state university college in Innlandet, Norway, established in 2017 from the merger of the Hedmark University College and Lillehammer University College. It has six campuses, of which Lillehammer is the biggest, located at the television and radio center built for the 1994 Winter Olympic Games.

History
The university was formed on 1 January 2017 from the merger of Hedmark University College and Lillehammer University College. The rector is Peer Jacob Svenkerud.

Locations
The university has campuses in Blæstad, Elverum, Evenstad, Hamar, Lillehammer and Rena. It has faculties spread across all sites, with approximately 16,000 students and 1,100 employees.

Education
The university offers 35 one-year study programs and 52 Bachelor's degree programs, with several taught in English. The university also offers 31 Master's degree programs and a choice of 4 PhDs (in addition to one in cooperation with the Norwegian University of Science and Technology). There are also teacher education and further education programs.

The main teaching and research areas are ecology and agricultural sciences, psychology, sports, law, music, health sciences, social sciences, teacher education, language and literature, biotechnology, film, television and culture, tourism, animation and game sciences, economics, and leadership and innovation.

The Norwegian Film School 
The Norwegian Film School is a faculty at INN University, founded as part of the university in 1997 in the facilities that hosted the media center during the 1994 Winter Olympics. The school had new facilities built in 2004.

Research
The merged university has the following priority research areas: 
Applied Ecology 
Audiovisual Media
 Game Sciences
Child and Youth Competence Development 
Services Innovation 
Teaching and Teacher Education

An Olympic Studies Centre was opened in 2018, and the Centre for Excellence in Film and Interactive Media Arts (CEFIMA) opened in the same year.

References

 
Universities and colleges in Norway
Education in Innlandet
Educational institutions established in 2017
Education in Hamar
Organisations based in Hamar
2017 establishments in Norway
Buildings and structures in Lillehammer
Universities and colleges formed by merger in Norway